Jennifer Bernice Campbell ( Sproson; born 5 October 1961) is a British entrepreneur. She bought YourCash Europe Ltd from RBS in 2010. She was a "Dragon" on two series of the UK's Dragons' Den.

In 2010, Campbell bought Hanco ATM systems from the Royal Bank of Scotland and subsequently renamed the business as YourCash. YourCash is an independent automated teller machine (ATM) provider with operations in the UK, Netherlands, Belgium and Ireland. In 2016, Campbell sold the business. Before doing this she had previously worked 32 years with the Royal Bank of Scotland Group in various roles, including sales, operational, change, risk and management.

Career 

Campbell left school at 16 to join NatWest as a cash-counter and cash point filler. She attended night school to study for banking qualifications and on passing her exams, moved to a job in NatWest's head office in London. Following the RBS takeover of NatWest in 2000, Campbell was given a senior role in the operational integration of the two banks.

Banking and YourCash 

In 2006 Campbell was appointed Head of Operations at Hanco ATM Systems, a subsidiary of RBS which would eventually become YourCash.

Hanco had significantly expanded in a short period of time and was making an annual loss of £7 million. Similar to the role she played in the integration of NatWest and RBS, Campbell was tasked with transforming the business on an operational and cultural level, and in turning it into a profitable business.

When the 2007 economic recession caused RBS to initiate the process of selling Hanco, Campbell seized the opportunity to buy the company. The sale was put on hold until 2009, but in mid-2010, Campbell led the first management buyout of Hanco. Shortly after, she renamed the business YourCash. In 2013, Campbell led a successful secondary buyout and the management team acquired 100% of the business through a refinancing agreement. Campbell became YourCash's primary stakeholder.

Under Campbell's guidance, YourCash continued to grow its ATM fleets in the UK and the Netherlands, as well as expanding into Belgium and Ireland.

In October 2016 YourCash was acquired by Euronet Worldwide Inc, a global leader in processing secure electronic financial and payment transactions.

Charity and speaking work 

Campbell is involved in charities and projects that support entrepreneurs and disadvantaged young people. This includes The Prince's Trust where she is the Vice President of the Enterprise Fellowship programme alongside Co-VP Nick Wheeler of Charles Tyrwhitt Menswear and Chair Stelio Haji-Ioannou, the founder of EasyJet.

In 2015, Campbell was admitted as a Freeman of the Guild of Entrepreneurs, which aims to foster the development of founders and new business owners while also bringing the opportunities of entrepreneurship to young people.

Dragons' Den (2017-2019) 

Campbell joined BBC's reality business programme Dragons' Den in 2017 as a dragon for Series 15 and Series 16. 

She invested in ParkingPerx, Didsbury Gin, hemp skincare producer Carun UK, truck advertising firm Driven Media and energy switching service Look After My Bills. Campbell sold her equity to Look After My Bills and Carun in 2019. It was announced that Campbell was leaving the show after only investing in five companies in 2019 to support her sons in their entrepreneurial businesses, and to focus on charity work. 

Due to the small amount of offers and investments Campbell made during her time in the Den, there is a joke among the show's internet community about her always being "out". This has even been acknowledged
by the official Dragons' Den YouTube channel, which published a compilation video of companies Campbell invested in, entitled "6 times Jenny Campbell Forgot to Say "I'm Out"".

Directorships 
Campbell is a Director of her son Tom's construction business Russon Campbell Developments Limited, a Director of The Kennel Club UK, and a Director of the Woman of the Year Awards.

Personal life 

Campbell was born in Hyde, Cheshire, on 5 October 1961. She attended Manchester High School for Girls.

Campbell is married and lives in rural Suffolk with her husband Andrew and several Flat-coated Retrievers. She has two sons. Campbell's hobbies include championship dog breeding, showing and judging. This began in her teens, establishing the Ronevorg Kennel name with several Cocker Spaniels when she was 16. She took a hiatus while bringing up her children and pursuing her banking career, but returned to showing Flat-coated Retrievers in 2004.

Awards and recognitions 

Campbell is an entrepreneur and woman in business. Her first award came at the age of 23 when, having completed her banking qualifications, she was awarded a Chartered Institute of Bankers prize.

In 2011 and in 2013, Campbell was recognized as the Ernst & Young Regional Finalist Entrepreneur of the Year award and then winning the silver award for Turnaround Entrepreneur in the Great British Entrepreneur Awards 2013.

Vitalise Business Woman of the Year 

In 2014, Campbell was named the winner of the Businesswoman of the Year award from Vitalise, with key credit going to her for her introduction of the free-to-use ATM proposition and European expansion of the YourCash business. The award recognizes the skills and talents of women in industry with the aim of inspiring others to reach their potential. Previous recipients of the award have included Karren Brady and Hilary Devey.

References

External links 
 Jennys personal website.
 Russon Campbell Developments.
 Kricket London
 Ronevorg Kennel. Photos and videos of Jenny's Flat-coated Retriever litters.
 Woman of the Year.
 

1961 births
Living people
Women chief executives
British chief executives
People educated at Manchester High School for Girls
People from Hyde, Greater Manchester
NatWest Group people